Ion John Cortright (June 29, 1889 – June 3, 1961) was an American football player and coach of football and basketball.  He served as the head football coach at the University of South Dakota (1914–1915), the University of Cincinnati (1916), and North Dakota Agricultural College, now North Dakota State University, (1925–1927), compiling a career college football record of 22–20–6.  Cortright was also the head basketball coach at South Dakota for one season in 1914–15, Cincinnati for one season in 1916–17, and North Dakota Agricultural  for one season in 1925–26, tallying a career mark of 38–14.

Head coaching record

Football

References

External links
 

1889 births
1961 deaths
Cincinnati Bearcats football coaches
Cincinnati Bearcats men's basketball coaches
Michigan State Spartans baseball players
Michigan State Spartans football coaches
Michigan State Spartans football players
North Dakota State Bison football coaches
North Dakota State Bison men's basketball coaches
South Dakota Coyotes football coaches
South Dakota Coyotes men's basketball coaches
People from Eaton County, Michigan
Coaches of American football from Michigan
Players of American football from Michigan
Baseball players from Michigan
Basketball coaches from Michigan